
Year 761 (DCCLXI) was a common year starting on Thursday (link will display the full calendar) of the Julian calendar. The denomination 761 for this year has been used since the early medieval period, when the Anno Domini calendar era became the prevalent method in Europe for naming years.

Events 
 By place 

 Britain 
 August 6 – Battle of Eildon: King Æthelwald Moll of Northumbria faces a rebellion, under a rival claimant to the throne named Oswine, brother of the murdered King Oswulf of Northumbria. Oswine is killed after a three-day battle against the forces of Æthelwald in Scotland. 
 Bridei V succeeds his brother Óengus I as king of the Picts (modern Scotland).

 Europe 
 The city of Oviedo (Northern Spain) is founded by the monks Nolan and John (approximate date).
 Construction is completed on the 108-room Castello di Lunghezza outside of Rome, Italy.

 Abbasid Caliphate 
 An Abbasid Caliphate army reconquers the city of Kairouan (in modern-day Tunisia), from 'Abd al-Rahmān ibn Rustam of the Rustamid dynasty. The latter is forced to flee west, where he creates an autonomous state around Tihert (Tiaret).
 Khurshid II, the last ruler (spāhbed) of Tabaristan, poisons himself when he learns that his family has been captured by the Abbasids.

 Asia 
 The Japanese priest Dōkyō cures Empress Kōken by using prayers and potions. He may have become her lover and certainly becomes her court favorite, arousing the jealousy of Emperor Junnin. 
 A great Chinese famine in the Huai-Yangtze area, late in the year, drives many people to cannibalism (approximate date).

Births 
 Shun Zong, emperor of the Tang Dynasty (d. 806)
 Wu Chongyin, general of the Tang Dynasty (d. 827)

Deaths 
 December 23 – Gaubald, bishop of Regensburg
 Donngal mac Laidcnén, king of the Uí Ceinnselaig (Ireland)
 Ibn Ishaq, Arab historian and hagiographer (or 767)
 Khurshid II, ruler (spāhbed) of Tabaristan (b. 734) 
 Óengus I, king of the Picts
 Shi Siming, general of the Tang Dynasty (b. 703)
 Empress Xin of China (b. unknown date)

References